William, Willie, Bill or Billy Henderson may refer to:

Musicians
Willie Henderson (musician) (born 1941), American soul music composer, arranger, producer 
Bill Henderson (performer) (1926–2016), American jazz vocalist and actor
Bill Henderson (Canadian singer) (born 1944), Canadian singer, songwriter and music producer
Billy Henderson (American singer) (1939–2007), vocalist with The Spinners

Public officials
William Henderson, 1st Baron Henderson (1891–1984), English Labour legislator
William L. Henderson (1894–1984), American judge
William Henderson (Canadian politician) (1916–2006), Canadian politician and judge
Bill Henderson (Northern Ireland politician) (1924–2010), Ulster journalist, television executive, politician
William J. Henderson (born 1947), American Postmaster General, Netflix executive
Bill Henderson (Isle of Man legislator) (born 1961), Manx legislator
Bill Henderson (Wyoming politician), American member of the Wyoming House of Representatives

Sports people
William Henderson (American football) (born 1971), fullback, TV football commentator
Martin Henderson (footballer) (William Martin Neville Henderson, born 1956), Scottish forward
Bill Henderson (manager) (1857–1929), American MLB manager
Willie Henderson (born 1944), Scottish winger
Bill Henderson (pitcher) (1901–1966), American pitcher
Bill Henderson (footballer, born 1878) (1878–1945), Scottish full back
William Henderson (footballer, born 1883) (1883–?), Scottish left half
Bill Henderson (footballer, born 1898) (1898–1964), Scottish forward
Bill Henderson (footballer, born 1899) (1899–1934), English outside right
Bill Henderson (soccer) (born 1929), Australian goalkeeper
Bill Henderson (Australian rules footballer) (1887–1956), footballer for Richmond and Melbourne
Billy Henderson (footballer) (1900–1934), English right back
Billy Henderson (coach) (1928–2018), American football player and coach
Bill Henderson (coach) (1901–1979), American basketball coach
William Henderson (cricketer) (1917–1995), South African cricketer
Bill Henderson (curler), Scottish curler
William Henderson (sport shooter) (born 1929), sports shooter

Writers
Bill Henderson (novelist) (born 1943), American author
Bill Henderson (publisher) (born 1941), American author, editor and publisher
William James Henderson (1855–1937), American journalist and music critic

Military
William Henderson (Royal Navy officer) (1788–1854), British admiral
William Hannam Henderson (1845–1931), British vice-admiral, founding editor of Naval Review
William Henderson (general) (1919–1995), Australian Army officer

Others
William Henderson (physician) (1810–1872), Scottish doctor
William Henderson (priest) (1819–1905), Dean of Carlisle
William G. Henderson (1882–1922), co-founder, Henderson Motorcycle and Ace Motorcycle Companies 
William Henderson (1766–1842), co-founder of Scottish Widows
William Henderson (landscape gardener), English landscape designer (1825–1866)
William Henderson (philanthropist) (1826–1904), Scottish shipping merchant, builder of Royal Infirmary
William Penhallow Henderson (1877–1943), American painter, architect, and furniture designer 
William Williams Henderson (1879–1944), American Mormon educator
William MacGregor Henderson (1913–2000), Scottish veterinary expert
William Henderson (actor), known for "Young Dylan Rhodes Shrike" in Now You See Me 2

Characters
Inspector William Henderson, American police official in Superman

See also
Henderson (surname)